Joona Kangas  (born 28 April 1997) is a Finnish freestyle skier. He competed in the 2015 and 2017 FIS Freestyle World Ski Championships, and in the 2018 Winter Olympics.

References

External links

1997 births
Living people
Finnish male freestyle skiers
Olympic freestyle skiers of Finland
Freestyle skiers at the 2018 Winter Olympics